Artemisia furcata, the forked wormwood, is an Asian and North American species of plants in the sunflower family found in cold regions at high elevations or high latitudes. It is native to Canada (British Columbia, Alberta, + all 3 Arctic territories), the United States (Alaska + Washington), eastern Russia (Siberia and Russian Far East), Kazakhstan, and Japan.

Artemisia furcata is a perennial up to 35 cm (14 inches) tall, not generally forming clumps. Leaves are gray-green, some forming a rosette at the base, others attached to the stem. Heads are small but numerous, yellow. The species is found in tundra and on talus slopes.

References

furcata
Flora of North America
Flora of Asia
Plants described in 1819